Molton may refer to:

People
Flora Molton (1908-1990), American singer
Gunnar Molton, drummer for Texas Hippie Coalition

Places 
South Molton, town in Devon, England
North Molton, village, parish and former manor in north Devon, England
Moltonville, North Carolina, unincorporated community, United States

Other uses
Molton or duvetyne, a type of twill fabric

See also
 Molten (disambiguation)
 Moulton (disambiguation)